Seebronn is a suburban district of Rottenburg am Neckar in the administrative district of Tübingen in Baden-Württemberg (Germany).

Geography 

Seebronn is located 7 km (4.4 mi) northwestern from Rottenburg am Neckar.

Extent 

The area of the district is 811 hectares. Thereof fall 73.0% upon agriculturally used area, 13.9% upon forest area, 11.8% upon settlement area and roads and 1.3% upon other.

Population 

Seebronn has 1714 residents (31/01/08). At an area of 7.51 km² (2.9 sq mi) this corresponds to a population density of 211 people per km², or 547 per sq mi.

Faiths 

Seebronn is predominantly Roman Catholic.

References

External links 
 http://www.rottenburg-seebronn.de Official Webpage (German)
 http://www.seebronn.info Private wiki-page with links and offers of the different societies and institutions of Seebronn (German)

Rottenburg am Neckar